The Centennial Conference baseball tournament is the annual conference baseball championship tournament for the NCAA Division III Centennial Conference. The tournament has been held annually since 1994. It is a double-elimination tournament and seeding is based on regular season records. The tournament champion receives the Centennial's automatic bid to the NCAA Division III Baseball Championship.

Results

References

External links  
 Official website
 History & Records (Archived) Updated Dec 15, 2021

College baseball conference tournaments in the United States
Tournament
Recurring sporting events established in 1994